EAS Europe Airlines was a French airline that operated from 1965 until 1995.

Code data

IATA code: EY
ICAO code: EYT
Callsign: Euro Line

Company history

Europe Aéro Service was a subsidiary of Societé Aero Sahara and began flights in 1965 with services between Perpignan and Palma de Majorca with Handley Page Dart Herald aircraft.  Other services were between Valence - Paris; Metz - Paris and Paris - Rennes.  The airline also operated charter flights.  In 1971 EAS was operating night freight flights for Air France mostly flying newspapers from Paris to Marseille, Toulouse, Algiers, Casablanca, Frankfurt, Milan, Tunis and Zurich.
Another aircraft used in the 1970s was the Vickers Vanguard and from 1972 the SE 210 Caravelle was used for passenger flights.

EAS also had a small fleet of small aircraft to flight small package flights.  Other aircraft used were the Boeing 737-222 and the Boeing 707-436.  Beginning in the 1990s, EAS began having financial problems and declared bankruptcy. A new owner was found who built up the airline once again, but the end could not be averted; on March 6, 1995 the company ceased operations.

Historic fleet details
The following aircraft types were operated by EAS:

Boeing 707-436
Boeing 727-200
Boeing 737-222
Handley Page Dart Herald
Nord 262
SE 210 Caravelle
Vickers Vanguard
Vickers Viking.

References

Notes

Bibliography

External links

Defunct airlines of France
Airlines established in 1965
Airlines disestablished in 1995